DJ-Kicks: Carl Craig is a DJ album mixed by Carl Craig. It was released on 1996 on the Studio !K7 independent record label as part of the DJ-Kicks series.

Track listing
  Hot Lizard - The Theme (Carl Craig rmx)
  Octagon Man - Teasing the Dragons Tail
  Nav Katze - Crazy Dream (Réload rmx)
  Cosmic Messenger - I2I
  Clark - Jak to Basics
  Designer Music - Good Girls
  Claude Young - Changing Factors
  Tan-Ru - Changeling
  Auto Repeat - You Can't Stop
  Random Generator - Zonepaging
  Gemini - Crossing Mars
  Neuropolitique - Switch Black
  P.A. Presents - Res*lute
  The 4th Wave - Electroluv
  Dimitri & Eric Nouhan - Folkloric Acid
  Carl Craig - DJ-KiCKS (the track)

References 

 DJ-Kicks website

Carl Craig
Carl Craig albums
1996 compilation albums